Glenray is an unincorporated community in Summers County, West Virginia, United States. Glenray is located on the south bank of the Greenbrier River, west of Alderson.

References

Unincorporated communities in Summers County, West Virginia
Unincorporated communities in West Virginia